Cristián Gastón Castaño (born June 8, 1985) is a former Argentine footballer.

Club career 
A graduate from the academy of the Boca Juniors, he played for San Lorenzo before spending the majority of his career in Indonesia, with exceptions in 2017 when he played for Thai side Nakhon Pathom and the Hong Kong Rangers. A year later, he retired.

Personal life 
He married Indonesian actress and singer Julia Perez in 2013. They divorced in 2016, but remained close until her death from cervical cancer in June 2017.

References

External links 
 

Living people
1985 births
Argentine footballers
Argentine expatriate footballers
Association football forwards
Argentine expatriate sportspeople in Indonesia
Expatriate footballers in Indonesia
Expatriate footballers in Hong Kong
Deportivo Armenio footballers
Liga 1 (Indonesia) players
PSS Sleman players
PSIS Semarang players
Persiba Balikpapan players
PSMS Medan players
Gresik United players
Pelita Bandung Raya players
Hong Kong Premier League players
Hong Kong Rangers FC players
People from Santiago del Estero
Sportspeople from Santiago del Estero Province